Kristina Petrunova (born 15 December 1991) is a Bulgarian footballer who plays as a midfielder. She has been a member of the Bulgaria women's national team.

References

1991 births
Living people
Women's association football midfielders
Bulgarian women's footballers
Bulgaria women's international footballers
Gintra Universitetas players
Bulgarian expatriate footballers
Bulgarian expatriate sportspeople in North Macedonia
Expatriate footballers in North Macedonia
Bulgarian expatriate sportspeople in Lithuania
Expatriate women's footballers in Lithuania